Roger Federer's 2015 tennis season began on 4 January 2015 at the 2015 Brisbane International. Federer added a new tactic nicknamed the SABR ("Sneak Attack by Roger") to his strategy. Like the prior season, he reached 11 finals. Highlights from this season include winning his 1000th career match in Brisbane, surpassing 9000 aces in Dubai, winning his first red clay court title in almost 6 years at the Istanbul Open, and two major runner-up finishes at both Wimbledon and the US Open. Despite the success, Federer dropped a rank to No. 3, ending the year with 6 titles.

Year summary

Australian Open and early hard court season

Brisbane International
Federer opened his season for the second consecutive year in Brisbane after reaching the final in 2014.  He defeated John Millman from a set and 1–3 down in his first match. He dropped only one game in a 39-minute victory over James Duckworth, before defeating Grigor Dimitrov in the semifinals in under an hour to set up a final against Milos Raonic. He recorded 1000 match win during the tournament.

Australian Open
Federer entered the first Grand Slam of the year as the second seed. He opened his campaign for his fifth crown at Melbourne Park with wins against Yen-Hsun Lu and Simone Bolelli but was upset in the third round by Andreas Seppi in four sets, his first ever loss against the Italian. This ended his  record of reaching at the least the semi-finals of the Australian Open for eleven consecutive years.

Dubai Tennis Championships

Federer opened his campaign for the seventh Dubai crown with a straight sets victory over Mikhail Youzhny of Russia and then defeated Spaniard Fernando Verdasco, winning in straight sets after a three-game deficit in the first set. Federer passed through the quarterfinals and semifinals with relative ease, dropping only four games against Richard Gasquet and Borna Ćorić. In the final, Federer defeated world No. 1 Novak Djokovic in two sets. Federer elevated his head-to-head record against Djokovic to 20–17 overall, and 15–13 on hard courts with the straight sets victory. The victory gave Federer a record 7th Dubai crown. He also finished the tournament without dropping a set. During the final match, Federer hit 12 aces and surpassed the 9,000 aces mark in his career total, joining Goran Ivanišević, Ivo Karlović and Andy Roddick as the only players to achieve the mark since aces totals were recorded.

Indian Wells Masters
As the No. 2 seed, Federer started his quest for a fifth title at the BNP Paribas Open with a victory over Argentinian Diego Schwartzman and avenged his earliest Australian Open defeat against Italian Andreas Seppi by beating him in windy conditions before claiming his 50th milestone win at the event by defeating American Jack Sock in straight sets. He then breezed past Tomáš Berdych in the quarterfinals. He extended his winning streak to 10 matches after battling hard in the semifinals against Milos Raonic and defeated him in straight sets to reach a sixth final in the desert. He lost to Novak Djokovic in the final in three sets.

Spring clay court season and French Open

Monte-Carlo Masters
Federer began his clay season at the Monte-Carlo Masters. He opened up against Jérémy Chardy who had beaten him on clay last year in Rome. However this time Federer beat him in straight sets. He then played Gaël Monfils in the third round and lost in straight sets.

Istanbul Open
Federer next played at the inaugural Istanbul Open. In his opening match he beat Jarkko Nieminen in straight sets, improving his record against Nieminen to 15–0. The win also gave Federer his 200th clay court win. He then defeated Daniel Gimeno-Traver in the quarterfinals in three sets. In the semifinals, he won in three sets again against Diego Schwartzman to advance to the final, continuing his streak of making at least one clay final a season since 2001. He defeated Pablo Cuevas in the final to claim his 85th career title. It was his first title on clay since he won the 2012 Mutua Madrid Open on blue clay and his first on red clay since he won the 2009 French Open.

Madrid Open
Federer next played at the Mutua Madrid Open as the top seed. He lost his opening match to Nick Kyrgios in three tiebreak sets, despite being up a set and a break and squandering two match points.

Italian Open
Federer won his second and third round matches against Pablo Cuevas and Kevin Anderson in straight sets. He cruised through Tomáš Berdych in the quarterfinals and Stan Wawrinka in the semifinals, winning both matches in straight sets after being down a break in the first set. He lost to Novak Djokovic in the final in straight sets.

French Open
Federer entered the French Open as the second seed.  He beat lucky loser Alejandro Falla in the first round and Marcel Granollers in the second round, before reaching the round of 16 by defeating Damir Dzumhur in straight sets.  He next played against Gaël Monfils but the match was interrupted due to darkness, after they split the first two sets.  The match continued the next day, with Federer prevailing in four sets.  He advanced to his 44th major quarterfinal and 11th at Roland Garros, where he lost in straight sets to his compatriot and eventual champion Stan Wawrinka in straight sets.

Grass court season and Wimbledon

Halle Open
Due to the tournament being upgraded to a 500 event, Federer was not given a first round bye. As the top seed and defending champion, Federer beat Philipp Kohlschreiber in the first round in three tight sets after being down 3–5 in the third set tiebreak. During the match, Federer slipped three times in poor conditions. Federer then beat Ernests Gulbis, Florian Mayer, and Ivo Karlović, all in straight sets, to make his 10th Halle final, where he defeated Andreas Seppi to win a record 8th Halle title. By winning he became the third man in the open era to win a tournament eight times after Guillermo Vilas and Rafael Nadal.

Wimbledon
Federer entered Wimbledon as the second seed. He beat Damir Dzumhur, Sam Querrey and Sam Groth in the first three rounds, losing just one set (a tiebreaker) against the Australian to reach the second week of the tournament. He easily beat Roberto Bautista-Agut in the fourth round in straight sets to advance to his 13th Wimbledon quarterfinal and 45th overall. In his first match on Court One of the tournament, he beat Gilles Simon in straight sets to advance to his 10th Wimbledon semifinal. He then played a flawless match to defeat Andy Murray in straight sets and advance to his 10th Wimbledon final in a repeat against Novak Djokovic, becoming the first man to reach 10 Grand Slam finals at a single event in the Open Era. However, Federer was unable to sustain his form against Djokovic as he squandered a break in the opening set due to a knee injury and despite a fightback to win the second-set tiebreaker from 3–6 down, he lost the match in 4 sets, committing 35 unforced errors in the process. It marked the first time Federer had lost two back to back finals at Wimbledon, and it again denied him the chance to win a record 18th Grand Slam and a record 8th Wimbledon title to break his shared record of 7 Wimbledon titles with Pete Sampras.

North American hard court season and the US Open

Cincinnati Masters
Federer began his summer hard court season at the Cincinnati Open as the second seed and defending champion. He defeated Roberto Bautista-Agut in the second round in straight sets before crushing Kevin Anderson in the third round to advance to the quarterfinals. He beat Feliciano López in straight sets to set up a semifinal clash against Andy Murray. In the semifinal he beat Murray in two tight sets to advance to the final. In the final, he met world No. 1, Novak Djokovic and defeated him in straight sets to win a record 7th Cincinnati title and also deny Djokovic from achieving a historic Career Golden Masters. The win saw Federer regain the No. 2 ranking. It also marked the second time that Federer did not lose a set or have his serve broken at a Masters 1000, having achieved this record at the same tournament back in 2012. This was also the first time that Federer had beaten the Top 2 players in the world at the same tournament, although this feat hadn't been possible during the years that Federer was ranked in the top 2 himself.

US Open
Federer entered the US Open as the second seed. He easily beat Leonardo Mayer and Steve Darcis in the first two rounds. He then beat Philipp Kohlschreiber in straight sets to advance to the fourth round where he defeated John Isner in three close sets that included two tiebreaks and finally breaking Isner's serve for the first time in the  since the 2013 US Open. He then dominated Richard Gasquet in the quarterfinals to advance to his 38th Major semifinal. Facing Stan Wawrinka, Federer triumphed in straight sets to advance to his 7th US Open final since 2009, where he played against Novak Djokovic for the sixth time this year for the championship. In their 42nd meeting overall, Federer lost to Djokovic in four sets, who once again leveled their rivalry to an even 21–21 head-to-head.

Davis Cup World Group-Play-offs
Switzerland  played against the Netherlands in the play-offs.  After Wawrinka won his match in five sets, Federer won his match against Jesse Huta Galung in straight sets to put Switzerland at a 2–0 lead against the Netherlands. He then played with Marco Chiudinelli in the doubles, but the pair lost to Matwé Middelkoop and Thiemo de Bakker in five sets. The loss did not tire Federer as he went on to beat Thiemo de Bakker in straight sets to put Switzerland back in the World Group.

Asian swing

Shanghai Masters
Federer played at the Shanghai Masters as the second seed and defending champion. He lost to qualifier Albert Ramos-Viñolas in the second round in three sets.

European indoor season

Swiss Indoors
Federer started his indoors season at the Swiss Indoors. As the defending champion, he easily beat Mikhail Kukushkin. He then defeated Philipp Kohlschreiber and David Goffin in three sets to advance to the semifinals. He then beat Jack Sock in straight sets to advance to his 10th straight Swiss Indoors final. He became the first man in the Open Era to achieve this record. Federer faced his archrival Rafael Nadal in their 34th career head-to-head meeting overall and their 21st finals meeting. Federer won in three sets giving him a record-extending 7th Swiss Indoors championship and his sixth title of the season. This was also his first win over Nadal since the 2012 BNP Paribas Open.

Paris Masters
Federer's next tournament was the Paris Masters where he was seeded third. He easily beat Andreas Seppi before losing in the third round to American giant John Isner in three sets without ever losing serve.

ATP World Tour Finals
Federer began his fourteenth consecutive year-end championships tournament with a straight sets victory over Tomáš Berdych. He then beat the defending champion, Novak Djokovic in straight sets, handing him his first loss at the year-end championships since 2011. The win over Djokovic also snapped the Serb's 38 match winning streak on indoor courts. With the win, Federer advanced to the semifinals for a record-breaking thirteenth time. He then won a tight three-setter against Kei Nishikori despite being up a set and a break to go undefeated in the round robin stage. In the semifinals, he defeated his compatriot Stan Wawrinka in straight sets after being down a break in the first set to advance to a record-breaking tenth final at the year-end championships, setting up a rematch against Djokovic. He lost to Djokovic in straight sets, which saw their head-to-head rivalry an even 22 matches each by the end of 2015.

All matches

Singles matches

Doubles matches

Singles schedule

Doubles schedule

Yearly records

Head-to-head matchups
Roger Federer has a  match win–loss record in the 2015 season. Bold indicates player was ranked top 10 at time of meeting. The following list is ordered by number of wins:

 Tomáš Berdych 3–0
 Philipp Kohlschreiber 3–0
 Andreas Seppi 3–1
 Stan Wawrinka 3–1
 Novak Djokovic 3–5
 Kevin Anderson 2–0
 Roberto Bautista Agut 2–0
 Pablo Cuevas 2–0
 Damir Dzumhur 2–0
 Richard Gasquet 2–0 
 Andy Murray 2–0
 Milos Raonic 2–0
 Diego Schwartzman 2–0
 Jack Sock 2–0
 Thiemo de Bakker 1–0
 Simone Bolelli 1–0
 Jérémy Chardy 1–0
 Borna Ćorić 1–0
 Steve Darcis 1–0
 Grigor Dimitrov 1–0
 James Duckworth 1–0
 Alejandro Falla 1–0
 Jesse Huta Galung 1–0
 Daniel Gimeno-Traver 1–0
 David Goffin 1–0
 Marcel Granollers 1–0
 Sam Groth 1–0
 Ernests Gulbis 1–0
 Ivo Karlović 1–0
 Mikhail Kukushkin 1–0
 Feliciano López 1–0
 Yen-hsun Lu 1–0
 Florian Mayer 1–0
 Leonardo Mayer 1–0
 John Millman 1–0
 Rafael Nadal 1–0
 Jarkko Nieminen 1–0
 Kei Nishikori 1–0
 Sam Querrey 1–0
 Gilles Simon 1–0
 Fernando Verdasco 1–0
 Mikhail Youzhny 1–0
 Gaël Monfils 1–1
 John Isner 1–1
 Nick Kyrgios 0–1
 Albert Ramos-Viñolas 0–1

Finals

Singles: 11 (6 titles, 5 runners-up)

Earnings

Awards
Stefan Edberg Sportsmanship Award
Record eleventh award in career (fifth consecutive)
ATPWorldTour.com Fans' Favourite
Record thirteenth consecutive award in career

See also
 2015 ATP World Tour
 2015 Andy Murray tennis season
 2015 Rafael Nadal tennis season
 2015 Novak Djokovic tennis season
 2015 Stan Wawrinka tennis season

References

External links
  
 ATP tour profile

2015 Roger Federer tennis season
Federer tennis season
2015 in Swiss tennis
2015 in Swiss sport